Otter Lake Outlet drains Otter Lake and flows southeast before emptying into Long Lake. It is in Oneida County, New York.

References

Rivers of New York (state)
Rivers of Oneida County, New York